Perfluorononanoic acid, or PFNA, is a synthetic perfluorinated carboxylic acid and fluorosurfactant that is also an environmental contaminant found in people and wildlife along with PFOS and PFOA.

Chemistry and properties
In acidic form it is a highly reactive strong acid. In its conjugate base form as a salt it is stable and commonly ion paired with ammonium. In the commercial product Surflon S-111 (CAS 72968-3-88) it is the primary compound present by weight. PFNA is used as surfactant for the production of the fluoropolymer polyvinylidene fluoride. It is produced mainly in Japan by the oxidation of a linear fluorotelomer olefin mixture containing F(CF2)8CH=CH2. It can also be synthesized by the carboxylation of F(CF2)8I. PFNA can form from the biodegradation of 8:2 fluorotelomer alcohol. Additionally, it is considered a probable degradation product of many other compounds.

PFNA is the largest perfluorinated carboxylic acid surfactant. Fluorocarbon derivatives with terminal carboxylates are only surfactants when they possess five to nine carbons. Fluorosurfactants reduce the surface tension of water down to half of what hydrocarbon surfactants can by concentrating at the liquid-air interface due to the lipophobicity of fluorocarbons. PFNA is very stable and is not known to degrade in the environment by oxidative processes because of the strength of the carbon–fluorine bond and the electronegativity of fluorine.

Environmental and health concerns
Like the eight-carbon PFOA, the nine-carbon PFNA is a developmental toxicant and an immune system toxicant. However, longer chain perfluorinated carboxylic acids (PFCAs) are considered more bioaccumulative and toxic. PFNA is an agonist of the nuclear receptors PPARα and PPARγ. In the years between 1999–2000 and 2003–2004, the geometric mean of PFNA increased from 0.5 parts per billion to 1.0 parts per billion in the US population's blood serum. and has also been found in human follicular fluid  In a cross-sectional study of 2003–2004 US samples, a higher (13.9 milligram per deciliter) total cholesterol level was observed in when the highest quartile was compared to the lowest. Non-HDL cholesterol (or "bad cholesterol") levels were also higher in samples with more PFNA.

In bottlenose dolphins from Delaware Bay, PFNA was the perfluorinated carboxylic acid measured in the highest concentration in blood plasma; it was found in concentrations well over 100 parts per billion. PFNA has been detected in polar bears in concentrations over 400 parts per billion. PFNA was the perfluorinated chemical measured in the highest concentration in Russian Baikal seals. However, PFOS is the perfluorinated compound that dominates in most wildlife biomonitoring samples.

Drinking water regulations
In the United States there are no federal drinking water standards for any of the perfluorinated alkylated substances as of late 2020. The U.S. Environmental Protection Agency (EPA) published a non-enforceable health advisory for PFOA in 2016. The agency's health advisory level for the combined concentrations of PFOA and PFOS is 70 parts per trillion (ppt).

In June 2020 the State of New Jersey published a drinking water standard for PFOA, the first state to do so. Public water systems in New Jersey are required to meet a maximum contaminant level (MCL) standard of 14 ppt. The state also set a PFOS standard at 13 ppt. The state had set a standard for PFNA in September 2018, with an MCL of 13 ppt.

In August 2020 the State of Michigan adopted drinking water standards for 5 previously unregulated PFAS compounds and lowered acceptable levels for 2 previously regulated compounds PFOS and PFOA to 16 ppt and 8 ppt respectively.  PFNA has a MCL of 6 ppt.

Food Regulation
In 2020, the European Food Safety Authority added PFNA in its revised safety threshold for PFAS that accumulate in the body. They set the threshold for a group of four PFAS of a tolerable weekly intake of 4.4 nanograms per kilogram of body weight per week.

Product Restrictions
In 2020, a California bill was passed banning PFNA as an intentionally added ingredient from cosmetics.

See also
Organofluorine compounds

References

External links
Perfluorocarboxylic Acid Content in 116 Articles of Commerce PDF
Centers for Disease Control and Prevention, Polyfluorochemicals fact sheet
Perfluorinated substances and their uses in Sweden
Perfluoroalkylated substances, Aquatic environmental assessment
Chain of Contamination: The Food Link, Perfluorinated Chemicals (PFCs) Incl. PFOS & PFOA

Perfluorocarboxylic acids
PBT substances
Anionic surfactants